Chiu Keng Guan (Chinese: 周青元; ; pinyin: Zhōu Qīng Yuán) is a Malaysian film director.

Career 
Born and raised in Batu Pahat, Johor, Chiu initially studied graphic design and then fine arts, and worked on ceramic and sculpture production before joining HVD Film Production, doing quality assurance.

Chiu then attended the Beijing Film Academy - which in recent times produced Zhang Yimou and Chen Kaige. Since then, he did TV dramas, commercials, corporate videos, and also worked as an assistant director and cameraman. He was also part of the pioneering group that helped set up 8TV, and freelanced for Astro.

Chiu emerged in the local movie scene with Astro and its movie production arm, Astro Shaw, in directing his acclaimed family-oriented Lunar New Year Trilogy of WooHoo! (2010), Great Day (2011) and The Journey (2014), and has been in close working relationship with them since. He is well known to have a preference for amateurs and non-actors, unlike most local commercial filmmakers, who would usually cast professional and famous actors. The cast of Woohoo! and Great Day consists mostly of non-actor celebrities from Astro's popular radio and TV channels, while major roles are given to amateurs in The Journey and Ola Bola. Frankie Lee Sai Peng, the lead actor for The Journey who won the 27th Malaysia Film Festival award for Best Actor, is one such example. Lee is the first recipient of Chinese descent and the eldest since its inauguration at 75 years old.

Chiu's work is known for its emotional charge, and has earned him numerous critical and commercial success, especially within Malaysia. In addition to breaking box office records in Malaysia, he is decorated with notable award wins and nominations, including the Golden Wau Awards and the Malaysia Film Festival awards.

Filmography

Accolades

References

External links

https://www.facebook.com/GWA2013/timeline?ref=page_internal
https://www.facebook.com/CFAM2013/

Year of birth missing (living people)
Living people
Malaysian film directors
People from Johor
Malaysian people of Chinese descent
Beijing Film Academy alumni